Swedberg is a Swedish surname. Notable people with the surname include:
Emanuel Swedberg, the birth name of Emanuel Swedenborg, Swedish scientist and philosopher 
Heidi Swedberg (born 1966), American actress and musician
Jesper Swedberg (1653–1735), Swedish bishop
Malin Swedberg (born 1968), Swedish footballer
Richard Swedberg, Swedish sociologist
Williot Swedberg, (born 2004), Swedish footballer

Swedish-language surnames